Life's Greatest Problem is a 1918 American silent war drama film directed and produced by J. Stuart Blackton.

The film exists today, preserved in the Library of Congress collection.

Cast
Mitchell Lewis as Big Steve Reardon
Rubye De Remer as Alice Webster
Gus Alexander as Little Lefty
Ida Darling as Mrs. Craig
Helen Ferguson as Miriam Craig
John P. Wade as John Craig
Eugene Strong as Dick Craig
John Goldsworthy as Frank Craig
John W. Martin as Shipyard Superintendent
Sidney D'Albrook as An Agitator
Bernard Randall as Craig's Secretary
Aubrey Beattie as Wilkins

Production
Filming began under the working title Safe for Democracy.

References

External links

1918 films
American silent feature films
Films directed by J. Stuart Blackton
American black-and-white films
American war drama films
1910s war drama films
1918 drama films
1910s American films
Silent American drama films
Silent war drama films